The Furusjö Alliance Church is a church building in Furusjö, Sweden. It was opened on 28 November 1920 and belongs to the Swedish Alliance Mission.

References

External links
official website 

20th-century churches in Sweden
Churches in Habo Municipality
Churches completed in 1920
Swedish Alliance Mission churches